Forty-seven Ronin refers to a case involving the samurai code of honor.

Forty-seven Ronin may also refer to:

The 47 Ronin (1941 film), directed by Kenji Mizoguchi
Chūshingura: Hana no Maki, Yuki no Maki, released as 47 Ronin in the United States and in Australia, a 1962 film directed by Hiroshi Inagaki
47 Ronin (1994 film), directed by Kon Ichikawa
47 Ronin (2013 film), starring Keanu Reeves